Chryseobacterium defluvii is a bacterium. It is Gram-negative, rod-shaped, non-spore-forming and yellow-pigmented, having been first isolated from wastewater, hence its name. Its type strain is B2T (=DSM 14219T =CIP 107207T).

References

Further reading

Whitman, William B., et al., eds. Bergey's manual® of systematic bacteriology. Vol. 5. Springer, 2012.

External links 
LPSN

Type strain of Chryseobacterium defluvii at BacDive -  the Bacterial Diversity Metadatabase

defluvii